The Battle of Cloghleagh, Cloghlea, Cloughleagh, Cloughleigh also known as the Battle of Funcheon Ford or the Battle of Manning Water, was a battle fought between a Royalist force and an Irish Confederate force during the Irish Confederate Wars. It took place south of Kilworth and north of Fermoy between the river Funcheon and the river Blackwater in County Cork on 4 June 1643. The result was an Irish Confederate victory.

Royalist Movements 
At the beginning of May 1643, Murrough O'Brien (Baron Inchiquin), governor of Munster on behalf of King Charles I "drew his forces out of the garrisons, where they were on the point of starving."

He divided his forces into three parts in order to gather provisions by pillaging. One army under Lieutenant Colonel Story was sent into Kerry; Inchiquin himself went to besiege Kilmallock; while the 3rd army under the command of Sir Charles Vavasour "respectively gathered from the Garrisons of Youghall, Talloe, Castlelyons, Mogily and Cappaquin; the whole number consisting of about 1200 Musketeers, and 200 Horse, besides Volunteers and Pillagers" and marched into county Waterford.

This army marched as far as Dungarvan capturing and burning castles and houses and taking cattle. By 3 June they were back in county Cork and attacked the castle of Cloghleagh (also known as Kilworth Castle and as Condon Castle). Cloghleagh castle had been the ancestral home of the Condons who had retaken it in 1642 from forces placed there by the Earl of Barrymore. The Condon reinstatement was to be a short one as Vavasour's army arrived and "after a well regulated dispute (stoutly defended by the rebels)" took it back. The occupants, 20 men, 11 women, and 7 children, were stripped and massacred (against the wishes of Colonel Vavasour who had left the castle to attend a dinner invitation at the house of a Mr Roche in Castlelyons).

On the morning of 4 June, Captain Hill of the Royalist force was sent to scout into county Tipperary with a squadron of horse and encountered the enemy. Having escaped with great difficulty, Captain Hill returned to Cloghleagh pursued by a force of Confederate cavalry who stopped on a hill overlooking Cloghleagh. Sir Charles Vavasour was sent for and he came back to Cloghleagh as "fast as his horse would carry him".

After consulting with his officers, he decided that the appearance of the enemy cavalry meant that a larger enemy force was approaching and that the best course of action was to retreat southwards from Cloghleagh castle by crossing the river Funcheon and then crossing the river Blackwater at the ford of Fermoy and moving towards Castlelyons. The army was formed up to march with "the front led by lieutenant King, the body by major Howel and the rear by Sir Charles himself, a forlorn-hope of about 160 musketeers in the rear was commanded by Captain Pierce Lacy, Captain Hutton, and lieutenant Stardbury and all our horse in the rear likewise."

Confederate Movements 
James Tuchet (Earl of Castlehaven) was commanded by the assembly of Irish Confederates to march south from Kilkenny and confront the Royalist armies in Munster. He gathered about 80 horse in Kilkenny and placed them under the command of Garret Talbot to which he joined his own lifeguard of 40 horse which was commanded by Garret Garrough Fitzgerald and marched together with his "great friend" Donagh MacCarthy (Viscount Muskery) and on the frontiers of Munster linked with "120 horse more, most of them gentlemen". 

At Cashel they met with General Barry, Lieutenant General Purcell and 700 foot. At Cashel they received intelligence that Inchiquin had abandoned the siege of Kilmallock and moved into Kerry but that Vavasour was at Cloghleagh with "16 or 1700 horse and foot" whereupon "I marched immediately towards him, and before night encamped within 3 miles of him".

Casltehaven’s brother in law, Richard Butler of Kilcash was sent out to scout and on the morning of 4 June he sent word that he was engaged with the enemy upon which Castlehaven "lost no time but marched with all haste with my horse………..The foot marched after, but the old general moved so slowly, that I had defeated the enemy before he came within two miles of the place".

Battle 
There is some confusion as to what exactly happened.

According to Castlehaven the Royalist army had got their cannon across the Blackwater, while they had drawn up their infantry on "a large plain." Castlehaven -

According to Borlase the Royalists -

According to Carte's account in A History of the Life of James Duke of Ormond -

References

Citations

Sources 
 
  – 1641 to 1643
 

1643 in Ireland
Cloughleagh
Cloughleagh
History of County Cork